Paul Joseph Woodroffe (born 12 June 1964) is a former English cricketer.  Woodroffe was a right-handed batsman who bowled right-arm medium pace.  He was born in Hillingdon, Middlesex.

Woodroffe made his debut for Buckinghamshire in the 1994 Minor Counties Championship against Suffolk.  Woodroffe played Minor counties cricket for Buckinghamshire from 1996 to 2003, which included 28 Minor Counties Championship matches and 13 MCCA Knockout Trophy matches.  In 1999, he made his List A debut against the Yorkshire Cricket Board in the NatWest Trophy.  He played four further List A matches for Buckinghamshire, the last coming against Dorset in the 1st round of the 2004 Cheltenham & Gloucester Trophy which was held in 2003.  In his five List A matches, he scored 31 runs at a batting average of 31.00, with a high score of 16*.  With the ball he took 7 wickets at a bowling average of 20.85, with best figures of 2/18.

He also played Second XI cricket for the Middlesex Second XI from 1995–1996.

References

External links
Paul Woodroffe at ESPNcricinfo
Paul Woodroffe at CricketArchive

1964 births
Living people
People from Hillingdon
English cricketers
Buckinghamshire cricketers